Mascouche is a city in Lanaudière, Quebec, Canada.

Mascouche may also refer to:

Mascouche station, a commuter rail station in Mascouche, Quebec
Mascouche River, a river in Lanaudière, Quebec

See also